The 47 ft Watson-class was a class of non self-righting displacement hull lifeboat built from 1955 to 1963 and operated by the Royal National Lifeboat Institution between 1956 and 1991.

History 
The 47 ft Watson was the final development of the basic hull design laid out by George Lennox Watson in the late nineteenth century and was designed by James Barnett. They were the final Watson type boats to be built and survived in service almost to the end of the displacement hull era. Unfortunately, on 10 December 1956, the boathouse at Thurso caught fire and both it and the lifeboat inside were destroyed. No further 47 ft Watsons were built during 1956 and production of the 46 ft 9in Watson continued during that year. Production of the new type resumed in 1957, with the first being a replacement boat for Thurso, still Civil Service no.31, but named Pentland. Production continued until 1963 when large displacement hull development turned to the self-righting 48 ft 6in Oakley-class and later Solent-class.

Description 
Compared to the preceding 46ft 9in Watson-class lifeboat, the new boats had a hull extended by 3 inches in both length and beam. The wheelhouse was fully enclosed with sliding doors on either side and there were bulwarks above the fenders fore and aft and, from the second boat, the forward cabin was increased in size. As with the previous year's 42ft Watson-class, the boats were powered by commercial diesel engines rather than the RNLI designed units used previously. In this case, two 60 bhp Gardner 5LW five cylinder diesels were fitted with the exhaust being taken up the mast as on the later 46 ft 9in boats. As built, the boats had line aerials rigged from the forward mast to a pole mast aft of the rear cabin. During their careers, this rig was replaced by twin pole aerials and the aft mast was removed. Radar was fitted on a bracket on the port side of the rear cabin roof (some had it fitted to the wheelhouse roof). From 1973, the boats were modified to become self-righting by, in most cases, the fitting of an air bag on the starboard side of the rear cabin roof, adjacent to the radar. This gave a once only self-righting ability which was successfully deployed when 's The Baltic Exchange capsized on service in 1983. Six boats were rebuilt with larger forward and aft superstructures (akin to the 48 ft 6in Oakley and Solent classes) which made them inherently self-righting. In these boats the masts were removed and the exhaust outlets were on the side of the hull. The engines in these six were uprated to 70 bhp and these modified boats were the longest lasting of the type, all but one serving into the 1990s.

Fleet 
ON is the RNLI's sequential Official Number.

External links
RNLI